Sa'id ibn Salm al-Bahili was an Arab governor and military commander of the early Abbasid Caliphate.

Life
Sa'id was the scion of a prominent family of the Bahila tribe: his father, Salm ibn Qutayba, had served both the Umayyads and the Abbasids as governor of Basra, and his grandfather had been the distinguished general Qutayba ibn Muslim. Several of Sa'id's brothers and uncles also held high office. 

In 776/7, he campaigned against Yusuf al-Barm in Khurasan. Sa'id was a close friend and boon-companion of Caliph al-Hadi. He was with al-Hadi at Jurjan when news came of the death of his father, Caliph al-Mahdi, and al-Hadi's accession; together the two rode for Baghdad, where al-Hadi ascended the throne. According to an account preserved by al-Tabari, Sa'id held the highest rank at court under al-Hadi, succeeding his own brother Ibrahim. 

Under Harun al-Rashid he was appointed to several provincial governorships. He was appointed to the Jazira in 796/7, and was governor of Arminiya in 799, during a Khazar raid into Abbasid territory. One account holds that the raid was provoked by Sa'id executing al-Munajjim al-Sulami—probably the local ruler of Derbent—prompting his son to go to the Khazars and ask for their help in obtaining revenge. The Khazars defeated Sa'id, who fled before them. It was only after Harun sent Khuzayma ibn Khazim and Yazid ibn Mazyad to the province that the Khazars were expelled and order restored. He also served as governor of Mosul, Tabaristan, and Sind (where he sent his brother Kathir as his deputy). 

In 807, Harun appointed him as commandant of the fortress town of Mar'ash, at the border with the Byzantine Empire. The Byzantines raided the area and took several captives, but Sa'id did not move to oppose them. He is last attested in al-Tabari in 808/9.

References

Sources
 
 

8th-century births
9th-century deaths
8th-century Arabs
9th-century Arabs
8th-century people from the Abbasid Caliphate
9th-century people from the Abbasid Caliphate
Abbasid governors of Arminiya
Abbasid governors of Mosul
Abbasid governors of Sind
Abbasid governors of Tabaristan
Bahila
Abbasid people of the Arab–Byzantine wars
Abbasid people of the Arab–Khazar wars